Adrien Carlton Clarke (born March 26, 1981) is a former American football guard. He was drafted by the Philadelphia Eagles in the seventh round of the 2004 NFL Draft. He played college football at Ohio State.

Clarke was a member of the New York Jets, Baltimore Ravens, Florida Tuskers and Virginia Destroyers. His wife's name is Tania Clarke. His children's  names are Christian Xavier Clarke, Mckenzie Clarke, Adrien Clarke II, Aaron Clarke, Driana Smith, Aiden Clarke, and Parker Clarke. Now he is the owner and CEO of Prograde Performance where he trains young athletes.

College career
Clarke played college football for the Ohio State Buckeyes and started in 43 games in his career. Following the 2003 season, he was invited to play in the 2004 Senior Bowl. He also won the 2002 national championship against Miami.

Professional career

Philadelphia Eagles
Clarke was drafted by the Philadelphia Eagles in the seventh round (227th overall) of the 2004 NFL Draft. He was signed to a four-year contract on July 15, 2004. He was placed on the injured reserve list at the beginning of the 2004 season after suffering a torn hamstring.

Clarke made his first NFL start in week 12 of the 2005 season, replacing injured left guard Artis Hicks. He started in four games total in 2005.

Clarke was waived/injured on August 29, 2006 due to a back injury that required surgery.

New York Jets
Clarke was signed by the New York Jets to a reserve/future contract on January 22, 2007. Clarke earned the starting left guard job in the preseason and started in 14 games in 2007.

He was waived on February 26, 2008.

Baltimore Ravens
On May 16, 2008, Clarke was signed by the Baltimore Ravens, but was released on August 30.

Florida Tuskers
Clarke was drafted by the Florida Tuskers of the United Football League in the sixth round (29th overall) of the 2010 UFL Draft. He started the 2010 season at right guard and was resigned in 2011 and will go into camp as the incumbent right guard for the now Virginia Destroyers.

References

External links
 Florida Tuskers bio

1981 births
American football offensive guards
Baltimore Ravens players
Living people
New York Jets players
Ohio State Buckeyes football players
Sportspeople from Shaker Heights, Ohio
Philadelphia Eagles players
Players of American football from Cleveland
Florida Tuskers players
Virginia Destroyers players